The Abeille class was a type of 16-gun brig-corvette of the French Navy, designed by François Pestel with some units refined by Pierre-Jacques-Nicolas Rolland. They were armed with either 24-pounder carronades, or a mixture of light 6-pounder long guns and lighter carronades. Twenty-one ships of this type were built between 1801 and 1812, and served in the Napoleonic Wars.

The four first ships were ordered in bulk on 24 December 1800, but two (Mouche and Serin) could not be completed due to shortages of timbers.
As the forerunner of the series, Abeille, is not always identified as such in British sources, the type is sometimes referred to as the Sylphe class, after Sylphe, which served as model for subsequent constructions.

Ships 
 Mouche
Builder: Toulon 
Begun: 24 December 1800
Launched: 
Completed:
Fate: Never completed due to lack of timber.

 Abeille
Builder: Toulon 
Begun: 24 December 1800 
Launched: 24 June 1801 
Completed: 21 May 1801 
Fate: Hulked in 1844, renamed Molène and used as an achor depot in Brest in 1865 

 Furet
Builder: Toulon 
Begun: September 1801 
Launched: 24 December 1801 
Completed: 25 February 1802 
Fate: Captured by HMS Hydra on 27 February 1806 

 Serin
Builder: Toulon 
Begun: 1802
Launched: 
Completed:
Fate: Never completed due to lack of timber.

 Faune
Builder: Nantes 
Begun: 1803 
Launched: 8 July 1804 
Completed: 
Fate: Captured by HMS Goliath on 2 August 1805 and commissioned in the Royal Navy as HMS Fawn

 Néarque
Builder: Caudan, Lorient 
Begun: 15 June 1803 
Launched: 27 April 1804 
Completed: 13 July 1804 
Fate: Captured by HMS Niobe on 28 March 1806.

 Sylphe
Builder: Dunkerque 
Begun: June 1803 
Launched: 10 July 1804 
Completed: 29 September 1804 
Fate: Captured by HMS Comet on 18 August 1808, commissioned in the Royal Navy as HMS Seagull 

 Adonis
Builder: Genoa (Italy) 
Begun: April 1805 
Launched: 18 August 1806 
Completed: 21 November 1806 
Fate: Broken up in 1823 

 Cygne
Builder: Le Havre Dockyard
Begun: 28 April 1806 
Launched: 12 September 1806 
Completed:
Fate: Ran aground and scuttled by fire to avoid capture 

 Écureuil
Builder: 
Begun: 
Launched: 
Completed:
Fate:

 Requin
Builder: 
Begun: 
Launched: 
Completed:
Fate:

 Béarnais
Builder: 
Begun: 
Launched: 
Completed:
Fate:

 Génie
Builder: 
Begun: 
Launched: 
Completed:
Fate:

 Pluvier
Builder: 
Begun: 
Launched: 
Completed:
Fate:

 Basque
Builder: 
Begun: 
Launched: 
Completed:
Fate:

 Hussard
Builder: 
Begun: 
Launched: 
Completed:
Fate:

 Renard
Builder: Genoa Dockyard
Begun: November 1808
Launched: 12 May 1810
Completed:
Fate: Seized by the British in 1814 with the capitulation of Genoa

 Zèbre
Builder: 
Begun: 
Launched: 
Completed:
Fate:

 Faune
Builder: 
Begun: 
Launched: 
Completed:
Fate:

 Actéon
Builder: 
Begun: 
Launched: 
Completed:
Fate:

 Inconstant
Builder: 
Begun: 
Launched: 
Completed:
Fate:

Notes and references

Notes

References

Bibliography 
 

 
Corvette classes
Age of Sail corvettes of France